Squatter's Delight or  In Krakende Welstand  is a 1990 Dutch drama film directed by Mijke de Jong. It was written by de Jong and Jan Eilander. The film was de Jong's first and she won the prize of the city of Utrecht (De Prijs van de stad Utrecht) at the Netherlands Film Days.

Plot
In the early 1980s, a group of people squatted a house in central Amsterdam and then legalised it. Several years later, the city council wants to increase the rent dramatically and people in the group respond in different ways.

Cast
Sophie Hoebrechts	... 	Eveline
Ottolien Boeschoten	... 	Kaat
Matthias Maat	... 	Michiel
Angela van de Zon	... 	Hansje
Pieter Anno	... 	Maurice
Ivo Jansen op de Haar	... 	Paul
Titus van der Bragt	... 	Martin
Bruno van Klaveren	... 	Marc
Robert Jan Birkenfeld	... 	Architect
Jan Lenferink	... 	Bekende Nederlander
Jeroen Planting	... 	Michiel

Critical response
Volkskrant saw the film as giving a "nuanced" view of the squatters movement, however squatters magazine Ravage found the film disappointing.

References

External links 
 

Dutch drama films
1990 films
1990s Dutch-language films
1990 drama films
Films directed by Mijke de Jong
Squatting in the Netherlands
Squatting in film